This is a list of flag bearers who have represented India at the Olympics. Flag bearers carry the national flag of their country at the opening ceremony of the Summer and Winter Olympic Games.

Men and women from across the country and from a variety of sports have been chosen to bear the flag at the opening ceremonies. Field hockey player Balbir Singh Sr. and Luge runner Shiva Keshvan are the only athletes who have been given the honour on more than one occasion. Balbir Singh Sr. was given this honour twice in 1952 and 1956 Summer Olympics, while Shiva Keshavan led the Indian contingent four times in 1998, 2002, 2010 and 2018 Winter Olympics. In the 1992 Summer Olympics, Shiny Abraham-Wilson  became the first woman to carry the flag of India at the opening ceremony of any Olympics. The first female flag bearer at the Winter Olympics was Neha Ahuja at the 2006 Winter Olympics.

List of flag bearers

Summer Olympics

Winter Olympics

See also
India at the Olympics

References

India at the Olympics
India
Olympians, flag bearers